Timo Pitter (born 1 September 1992) is a German former professional footballer who plays as a midfielder for TSV Aubstadt.

Career
Pitter played for over two seasons with German side 1. FC Schweinfurt 05 between 2010 and 2012, before accepting a scholarship to play college soccer at Creighton University, where he played until 2015.

On 14 January 2016, FC Dallas selected Pitter 33rd overall in the 2016 MLS SuperDraft. He made his debut on 26 March 2016 as an 81st minute substitute during a 3–0 victory over D.C. United. Pitter retired from professional soccer on 27 January 2017.

References

External links
 
 
 Creighton bio

1992 births
Living people
All-American men's college soccer players
Association football midfielders
Creighton Bluejays men's soccer players
Expatriate soccer players in the United States
FC Dallas draft picks
FC Dallas players
Footballers from Bavaria
German expatriate footballers
German expatriate sportspeople in the United States
German footballers
Major League Soccer players
OKC Energy FC players
People from Schweinfurt (district)
Sportspeople from Lower Franconia
USL Championship players
1. FC Schweinfurt 05 players
TSV Aubstadt players
Regionalliga players
21st-century German people